The 1961-62 NBA season was the Knicks' 16th season in the NBA.

Regular season

Season standings

x – clinched playoff spot

Record vs. opponents

Game log

Awards and records
Richie Guerin, All-NBA Second Team

References

New York Knicks seasons
New York
New York Knicks
New York Knicks
1960s in Manhattan
Madison Square Garden